Phenix City Public Schools is a school district located in Phenix City, Russell County, Alabama.

Schools
Central High School/Central Freshman Academy
South Girard Jr. High School
Phenix City Intermediate School
Lakewood Elementary School/Lakewood Primary School
Meadowlane Elementary School
Phenix City Elementary School
Ridgecrest Elementary School
Sherwood Elementary School
Westview Elementary School

External links
 

Education in Russell County, Alabama